The Nyima languages are a pair of languages of Sudan spoken by the Nyimang of the Nuba Mountains that appear to be most closely related to the Eastern Sudanic languages, especially the northern group of Nubian, Nara and Tama.

Languages
The languages are:
Ama (Nyimang) —  speakers
Dinik (Afitti) — 4,000 speakers (2009)

Claude Rilly (2010) includes reconstructions for Proto-Nyima.

See also
List of Northern Eastern Sudanic reconstructions (Wiktionary)

References

 
Northern Eastern Sudanic languages
Language families

br:Yezhoù tamek
mk:Тамански јазици